Sky-Map.org (or WikiSky.org) is a wiki and interactive sky map that covers more than half a billion celestial objects. Users can view the whole star sky at once and zoom in to view areas in greater detail. WikiSky includes many stars, galaxies, constellations, and planets, but it is still in development. Users can also edit information about different stars by writing articles, adding Internet links, uploading images, or create a special interest group for a specific task. The website, although still available for users to visit, has not shown much activity since 2010.

Software
Users may browse the sky in several surveys, including GALEX, DSS, and SDSS. In either mode, the user can access the name and a brief description of visible objects. This can be used to access more detailed information, including articles and different photo images.

Sky-Map.org also has its own API so that code can be written to access maps, objects’ information and SDSS data. The API that has more functionality than the interactive part of the website currently uses.

Wikisky image copyrights
Some images from Wikisky, such as Digitized Sky Survey (DSS2) are "non-commercial use".  The DSS datarights are held by multiple institutions.  Sloan Digital Sky Survey (SDSS) images are now public domain, although earlier data releases were for non-commercial use only.  Images from the Hubble Space Telescope (HST), Spitzer Space Telescope (infrared) or GALEX space telescope (ultraviolet) are "PD-NASA-USgov".

Similar maps

References

External links
 
 SKY-MAP.ORG - API

Astronomical surveys
Observational astronomy
Astronomy websites
Wikis